In Greek mythology, Prosymna (Ancient Greek: Πρόσυμνα or Πρόσυμναν from prosymneô meaning 'celebrate in song') was one of the Argive naiad daughters of the river-god Asterion. She and her sisters, Acraea and Euboea, were the nurses of Hera. The town of Prosymna which is beneath Heraion was named after the nymph.

Notes

References 

 Pausanias, Description of Greece with an English Translation by W.H.S. Jones, Litt.D., and H.A. Ormerod, M.A., in 4 Volumes. Cambridge, MA, Harvard University Press; London, William Heinemann Ltd. 1918. . Online version at the Perseus Digital Library
 Pausanias, Graeciae Descriptio. 3 vols. Leipzig, Teubner. 1903.  Greek text available at the Perseus Digital Library.

Naiads
Nymphs
Children of Potamoi
Argive characters in Greek mythology
Mythology of Argos